Christopher L. Taylor (August 26, 1828May 20, 1914) was an American businessman, Democratic politician, and pioneer of Maiden Rock, Wisconsin.  He represented Pierce County in the Wisconsin State Assembly during the 1876 session.

Biography
Christopher L. Taylor was born in Niagara County, New York, in August 1828.  Other positions he held include chairman of Maiden Rock, Wisconsin. He was a Democrat.

Taylor died at Prescott, Wisconsin, on May 20, 1914.

References

1829 births
1914 deaths
People from Niagara County, New York
People from Maiden Rock, Wisconsin
Democratic Party members of the Wisconsin State Assembly
Mayors of places in Wisconsin